Megginch Castle is a 15th-century castle in Perth and Kinross, in central Scotland. It was the family home of Cherry, 16th Baroness Strange. It is now lived in by Lady Strange's daughter, Catherine Drummond-Herdman, her husband and four children.

Megginch Castle is a private family home, which is only open for special events. The gardens are home to trees such as ancient yews, there is a topiary, and in the spring there is an extensive display of daffodils.  The orchard contains two National Plant Collections of Scottish apples, and pears, and cider apples. The gardens are listed on the Inventory of Gardens and Designed Landscapes in Scotland. The Gardens are open once a year under the Scotland's Gardens Scheme.

References

External links
Scottish Castles Photo Library - Megginch Castle, Perthshire
Overview of Megginch Castle
Megginch Castle Gardens

Castles in Perth and Kinross
Houses in Perth and Kinross
Category A listed buildings in Perth and Kinross
Listed castles in Scotland
Inventory of Gardens and Designed Landscapes